The 1935 Green Bay Packers season was the franchise 's 17th season overall, 15th season in the National Football League, and the 17th under head coach Curly Lambeau. The team improved on their 7–6 record from 1934 and finished with an 8–4 record and earning them a second-place finish in the Western Conference. They failed to qualify for the playoffs for the fourth consecutive season.

Regular season

Schedule

Standings

References

Sportsencyclopedia.com

Green Bay Packers seasons
Green Bay Packers
Green Bay Packers